Sir Godfrey Nicholson, 1st Baronet (9 December 1901 – 14 July 1991) was a British Conservative Party Member of Parliament (MP).

Early life and education
A member of the family which founded London-based gin distillers J&W Nicholson & Co, Nicholson was a younger son of Richard Francis Harrison and a grandson of politician, William Nicholson. He was educated at Winchester College and graduated from Christ Church, Oxford in 1925.

Political and military career
In 1931, he contested and won Morpeth and held the seat until 1935. Two years later, he contested and won Farnham in a by-election and on the outbreak of World War II in 1939, he served with The Royal Fusiliers until 1942. He was subsequently a captain in the Home Guard and as MP criticized that an issue of pikes to the Home Guard made during a shortage of rifles "if not meant as a joke, was an insult".

Personal life
On 20 March 1958, Nicholson was made a baronet and retired from politics in 1966. On 30 June 1936, he had married Lady Katharine Lindsay (a younger daughter of the 27th Earl of Crawford) and they had four daughters:

Rose Helen (b. 13 May 1937), married The Lord Luce.
Laura Violet (18 January 1939 -  2 June 2021), married Sir John Montgomery-Cuninghame of Corsehill, 12th Baronet.
Emma Harriet (b. 16 October 1941), married Sir Michael Harris Caine.
Harriet Mary (b. 29 June 1946), married Charles Hugh Flower (a maternal great-great-grandson of the 1st Duke of Abercorn).

Sir Godfrey was a favourite at the London Gliding Club where they appreciated his passing of favourable laws regarding gliding.

As Nicholson had no sons from his marriage, his title became extinct upon his death in 1991.

References

External links 

British Army Officers 1939−1945

1901 births
1991 deaths
People educated at Winchester College
Alumni of Christ Church, Oxford
Baronets in the Baronetage of the United Kingdom
British Army personnel of World War II
Conservative Party (UK) MPs for English constituencies
Royal Fusiliers officers
UK MPs 1931–1935
UK MPs 1935–1945
UK MPs 1945–1950
UK MPs 1950–1951
UK MPs 1951–1955
UK MPs 1955–1959
UK MPs 1959–1964
UK MPs 1964–1966
British Army officers
British Home Guard officers
Members of the Parliament of the United Kingdom for Morpeth